Sweet Revenge (also released as Dandy, the All American Girl) is a 1976 American crime film directed by Jerry Schatzberg. It was entered into the 1976 Cannes Film Festival. It was the second leading role for actress Stockard Channing in a film, following the previous year's The Fortune in which she co-starred opposite Jack Nicholson and Warren Beatty.

Plot
Vurrla, also known as Dandy, is a car thief. As a public defender tries in vain to understand her, the only thing driving the young woman is to steal enough automobiles to make enough money to buy a Ferrari Dino, her dream car.

After being arrested, Vurrla fools her court-appointed lawyer, Le Clerq, into vouching for her character. He later learns that she's been arrested more than once, skips court appearances and is wanted by the law. Le Clerq is irresistibly fascinated by her, even after she abuses his trust and even makes him an unwitting accomplice in a shoplifting.

Using a scheme that involves various disguises, dialects and phony stories, Vurrla cons a number of innocent people by selling stolen vehicles to each, getting paid in cash. She betrays former boyfriend Andy in the process, causing him to be jailed and lash out at her. She also ends up costing childhood friend Edmund, another thief, his life during a police pursuit when his car plunges off a street ramp.

Finally unable to cajole her way out of trouble, Vurrla takes possession of her coveted Ferrari, goes for one fast ride in it, then sets it on fire. Presumably ready to surrender to authorities, she is asked by Le Clerq, her lawyer, "Was that absolutely necessary?"

Cast
 Stockard Channing as Vurrla Kowsky
 Sam Waterston as Le Clerq
 Franklyn Ajaye as Edmund
Jan D'Arcy as Linda
 Richard Daughty as Andy
 Norman Matlock as John
 Marvin Rosand as Policeman
 Robert Lewis-Ferguson as Policeman #2
 Betta St. George as Woman Guard
 Evan A. Lottman as Bailiff (as Evan Lottman)
 Adrian Sparks as D.A.
 Jock Dove as Judge
 Duncan Maclean
 Brooks Woolley as Ferrari Salesman
 Edmund Villa as Greg (as Ed E. Villa)
 Adele Burnett as Judge Adams

Reception
MGM gave the film a very limited release with virtually no promotion. As a result, the film came and went very quickly and received few contemporary reviews. Vincent Canby did not review the film until June 26, 1981 in The New York Times, under the title Dandy, the All-American Girl. He wrote: "Dandy' is not exactly a failure, though it is easy to understand why it failed to find an audience." In critic Leonard Maltin's Movie Guide book of reviews, this film, as Sweet Revenge, is called a "turkey" and given his lowest possible rating, "BOMB."

References

External links

1976 films
1976 comedy films
1970s crime comedy films
American crime comedy films
1970s English-language films
Metro-Goldwyn-Mayer films
Films directed by Jerry Schatzberg
Films scored by Paul Chihara
1970s American films